Gurdybashevo (Gürźebaş) is a rural locality (a village) in Taktagulovsky Selsoviet, Bakalinsky District, Bashkortostan, Russia. The population was 105 as of 2010. There is 1 street.

Geography 
Gurdybashevo is located 27 km east of Bakaly (the district's administrative centre) by road. Mullanurovo is the nearest rural locality.

References 

Rural localities in Bakalinsky District